Hovel may refer to:

The brick outer shell of a bottle oven
Hövels is a municipality in the district of Altenkirchen, in Rhineland-Palatinate, in western Germany.

See also
 Rondavel, literally "round hovel"